Frederic Whiting  (1874 – 1 August 1962) was an English painter who had studied at the Académie Julian and taught at Heatherley School of Fine Art with Iain Macnab and Bernard Adams. His work was part of the painting event in the art competition at the 1948 Summer Olympics. He also worked for The Graphic as a war correspondent, covering the Chinese and Russo-Japanese War.

References

1874 births
1962 deaths
19th-century English painters
English male painters
20th-century English painters
Académie Julian alumni
Members of the Royal Institute of Painters in Water Colours
Olympic competitors in art competitions
20th-century English male artists
19th-century English male artists